Posani Krishna Murali (born 22 January 1958) is an Indian screenwriter, actor, director and producer who primarily works in Telugu cinema. He worked as a writer for over 150 Telugu films and directed a number of films. In 2009, he also contested in Andhra Pradesh state legislative assembly elections from Chilakaluripet constituency but lost the elections.

Early life and education
Posani was born on 22 January 1958 in Pedakakani, Guntur, Andhra Pradesh. His father Posani Subba Rao worked as a small-time employee in Pedakakani and his mother was a housewife. He has an elder sister Rajyalakshmi and a younger sister Prameela. He also has a younger brother Posani Amar Bhosale. He is the cousin of Boyapati Srinu. Growing up, Posani's family struggled financially and his father was not educated and wanted Posani to study well so that he could have a better life. Posani did his schooling in a small village in Guntur district and went on to do his BComm. He joined Acharya Nagarjuna University in Guntur and graduated with an MA degree. During his time in Nagarjuna University, he was elected as the general secretary for the student body. After completing his master's degree, he worked in a small chit fund company in Hyderabad. He was offered a job in Margadarsi Chit Fund. After a year of working there, he resigned his job and went back to Guntur. Posani, saddened and distressed after his father's untimely death, went to Chennai to find work. With no friends in Chennai, Posani met Paruchuri Gopala Krishna at his home and asked him for work. Gopal Krishna gave him an opportunity to work as an assistant under him. Posani later joined Presidency College and graduated with a MPhil degree, which was his second master's degree. He wanted to obtain a PhD degree. Although he joined a college to do so, he later discontinued his studies because of his work.

Career

Assistant writer and early work (1992–1998)
He joined as an assistant writer under the writing duo Paruchuri Brothers. While he was still working under them and pursuing his MPhil degree in Madras, Ram Gopal Varma asked him to write dialogues for one of his films. Posani declined the offer and told Ram Gopal Varma that he still had a lot to learn from the Paruchuri Brothers and he wasn't ready to take up a film on his own. Posani worked for five years under the Paruchuri Brothers assisting them in over 100 films. In 1992, he finally quit as assistant writer to further his career. He played a small cameo role in the 1992 Telugu film Dharma Kshetram. He landed a job of writing story and dialogues for the film Police Brothers under the direction of Mohan Gandhi. Also Ram Gopal Varma gave him an opportunity to write dialogues for his 1993 film Gaayam. Varma also recommended Posani to Nagarjuna, which led him to write for the film Rakshana. He was also given a breakthrough opportunity to write for Chiranjeevi's Alluda Majaka directed by E. V. V. Satyanarayana. He wrote the story, dialogues and screenplay for the film.  He continued working in successful films such as Pavithra Bandham, Thaali, Preminchukundam Raa, Pellichesukundam, Gokulamlo Seetha, Sivayya, Ravanna and Master.

Popularity and acting (1999–2004)
In 1999, he worked as a writer for eight films, the highest by any Telugu writer in that year. In 2000, he worked as a writer for nine films. In 2001, while still busy as a writer, he began his acting career with Srihari's Evadra Rowdy for which he also wrote the story and screenplay. In 2002, his second film as an actor Gemini starring Venkatesh was released. The same year also saw Posani in Mahesh Babu's Bobby which was directed by Sobhan. Although the film was a failure at the boxoffice, Posani's performance in the film was praised. He continued to appear in films such as Good Boy and Bhadradi Ramudu. He also continued writing for films such as Orey Thammudu, Raghavendra, Simhachalam, Bhadradi Ramudu, Palanati Brahmanaidu, Seetayya, Tiger Harish Chandra Prasad and Gemini.

Film direction and success (2005–present)
After writing for about one hundred and fifty Telugu films, Posani Krishna Murali decided to direct a film. He established the production company called UP Cinema Lines. In 2005, he wrote, directed and produced Sravanamasam starring Krishna, Harikrishna, Suman, Vijaya Nirmala, Bhanupriya, Keerthi Chawla, Kalyani, and Gajala. Although the film had a big star cast and more than sixty character artists which included comedians and artists of Telugu cinema like Brahmanandam, Kota Srinivasa Rao, Krishna Bhagavaan, Tanikella Bharani, Giri Babu, Kondavalasa, Dharmavarapu Subramanyam, Sunil, Venu Madhav, L.B. Sriram, M. S. Narayana, Mallikarjuna Rao, AVS, Ali and Babu Mohan, the film was a failure at the box office and Posani's direction was heavily criticised. Posani also incurred heavy losses financially due to the failure of this film. Post Sravaanamasam, he acted in films such as Athadu, Game and Munna. In 2006, he began working on his next directorial venture. He wrote the script and approached Telugu actor Srikanth to play a lead role in the film. Impressed by the script, Srikanth agreed to do the film and Posani secured a producer for the project. The film was a political satire and was titled Operation Duryodhana and was released in 2007. The film was successful at the box office earning nearly ten times its budget. Posani's direction was also praised by the critics. He continued to direct films such as Apadamokkulavadu, Mental Krishna, Rajavari Chepala Cheruvu, Posani Gentleman and Dushasana. He also began acting in lead roles in films such as Mental Krishna, Rajavari Chepala Cheruvu and Posani Gentleman. He has also been playing supporting roles in prominent Telugu films, with his latest being the 2018 film MLA.

Filmography

Film

As an actor

Television

References

External links
 

Living people
Telugu male actors
Telugu comedians
Indian male film actors
1958 births
Male actors from Andhra Pradesh
21st-century Indian film directors
Telugu film directors
Indian male comedians
People from Guntur district
Indian male screenwriters
Telugu screenwriters
20th-century Indian male actors
21st-century Indian male actors
Screenwriters from Andhra Pradesh
21st-century Indian dramatists and playwrights
Telugu film producers
Film directors from Andhra Pradesh
Film producers from Andhra Pradesh
Male actors in Telugu cinema
21st-century Indian male writers
21st-century Indian screenwriters